Amerigo Petrucci (17 December 1922 – 31 July 1983) was an Italian Christian Democrat politician. He was mayor of Rome from 1964 to 1967. He was appointed Knight Grand Cross of the Order of Merit of the Italian Republic in 1963.

Biography 
Graduated in philosophy, Petrucci joined the Christian Democracy in 1944, until he became the number two party in Rome after Giulio Andreotti in 1961, of which he belongs. Provincial councilor of Rome from 1952 to 1960 and municipal councilor from 1960 to 1972, Petrucci, from December 1960 to July 1961, was assessor in charge of the "new town plan", in the minority municipal government led by Urbano Cioccetti. In 1962 Petrucci was re-confirmed councilor in charge of town planning in the city government headed by Glauco Della Porta.

Two years later Della Porta resigned and on 13 March 1964 Petrucci was elected mayor, at the head of a centre-left government. During his mandate, the capital will experience a notable phase of economic recovery. On 31 March 1966, the resolution was approved that started the administrative decentralization, with the creation of twelve municipal districts.

In the local elections of 12 June 1966, the centre-left obtained an absolute majority in the municipal council of Rome and Petrucci was re-elected mayor. But his goal was to stand as a candidate for the Chamber of Deputies in the 1968 general elections. According to the rules then in force, the office of mayor of a large city is an obstacle to parliamentary candidacy: Petrucci, therefore, resigns as mayor on 13 November 1967, assuming the post of councilor for the budget in the new council led by Rinaldo Santini, a trusted man. His objectives, however, suffered a setback: on 20 January 1968 he was indicted and placed in preventive detention for a few months, due to an incident linked to the management of the National Maternity and Childhood Work (OMNI) of which he had previously been commissioner. Many of the charges fell during the investigation and Petrucci was acquitted with full formula by the Court of Rome on 28 April 1972.

Elected deputy for the first time in 1972 and then re-elected in 1976, 1979 and 1983, Petrucci was Undersecretary of Defense from 31 July 1976 to 1 December 1982; he held this office in all the governments of the VII and VIII Legislature, with the exception of the fifth Fanfani government.

He died in 1983 following a heart attack.

References

1922 births
1983 deaths
Politicians from Rome
Christian Democracy (Italy) politicians
Mayors of Rome
Deputies of Legislature VI of Italy
Deputies of Legislature VII of Italy
Deputies of Legislature VIII of Italy
Deputies of Legislature IX of Italy
Knights Grand Cross of the Order of Merit of the Italian Republic